A  satellite village is a term for one or more settlements that have arisen within the outskirts of a larger one.

See also
 Satellite state

References
Lund Studies in Geography: Human Geography. 1989. Issues 53–56. Page 103. Google Books
Kanok Rerkasem. Assessment of Sustainable Highland Agricultural Systems. 1994. Pages 107 and 108. Google Books

External links
 Dictionary.com definition of satellites

Types of village